René Glatzer (born 24 February 1977) is a retired Austrian football midfielder.

References

1977 births
Living people
Austrian footballers
FK Austria Wien players
LASK players
Wiener Sport-Club players
Association football midfielders
Austrian Football Bundesliga players
People from Mödling
Footballers from Lower Austria